Parfait is a food. Parfait may also refer to:

 Cathar Perfect (also called Parfait), a religious leader among the Cathars
 Parfait (album), a 1982 album by bassist Ron Carter